Benjamin Walker may refer to:

Benjamin Walker (actor) (born 1982), American actor, star of Abraham Lincoln: Vampire Hunter
Benjamin Walker (author) (1913–2013), English author on religion and philosophy, and an authority on esoterica
Benjamin Walker (New York soldier) (1753–1818), Continental Army officer and United States Representative from New York
Ben Walker (born 1976), Australian rugby league player
 Benjamin Walker (firefighter), British firefighter